In enzymology, a NADPH—cytochrome-c2 reductase is an enzyme that catalyzes the chemical reaction

NADPH + 2 ferricytochrome c2  NADP+ + H+ + 2 ferrocytochrome c2

Thus, the two substrates of this enzyme are NADPH and ferricytochrome c2, whereas its 3 products are NADP+, H+, and ferrocytochrome c2.

This enzyme belongs to the family of oxidoreductases, specifically those acting on NADH or NADPH with a heme protein as acceptor.  The systematic name of this enzyme class is NADPH:ferricytochrome-c2 oxidoreductase. Other names in common use include cytochrome c2 reductase (reduced nicotinamide adenine dinucleotide, phosphate), cytochrome c2 reductase (reduced nicotinamide adenine dinucleotide, and phosphate, NADPH).  It employs one cofactor, FAD.

References

 

EC 1.6.2
NADPH-dependent enzymes
Flavoproteins
Enzymes of unknown structure